Hanit Schwartz (or Schwarz, born 23 October 1987) is an Israeli football goalkeeper, currently playing for F.C. Ramat HaSharon. She is a member of the Israeli national team, since making her debut in 2005, against Estonia

Club career
Schwartz had played in the Israeli First League since 2000, first appearing for Hapoel Be'er Sheva, where she had played until 2008. Between 2008 and 2011, Schwartz attended Martin Methodist College, making 77 appearances for the Redhawks' women's soccer team, allowing only 36 goals.
After graduating, Schwartz returned to Israel and appeared for Maccabi Holon, Maccabi Be'er Sheva and F.C. Ramat HaSharon

International career
Schwartz made her debut for the Israel women's national football team in 2005 against Estonia and so far played 28 matches for the national team. Schwartz had also played for the U-19 national team, making 12 appearances between 2003 and 2005

References

External links
 

1987 births
Israeli Jews
Living people
Israeli women's footballers
Israel women's international footballers
Expatriate women's soccer players in the United States
Hapoel Be'er Sheva F.C. (women) players
Maccabi Holon F.C. (women) players
Maccabi Be'er Sheva F.C. (women) players
F.C. Ramat HaSharon players
UT Southern FireHawks women's soccer players
Women's association football goalkeepers
Israeli expatriate women's footballers
Israeli expatriate sportspeople in the United States
Footballers from Beersheba